Michel Souza da Silva (born 22 August 1986), known simply as Michel, is a Brazilian former professional footballer who played as a striker.

Club career
Born in Rio de Janeiro, Michel moved to Portugal initially as a futsal player, but he switched to association football shortly after because of his physical strength and powerful shots. He started his career with F.C. Penafiel in the third division, scoring 13 goals in 32 games in his first season, which ended in promotion.

In mid-July 2011, after two more years with the club in the Segunda Liga, Michel signed for F.C. Paços de Ferreira. In his only season, he ranked as team top scorer as they retained their Primeira Liga status, notably netting against Sporting CP (twice) and S.L. Benfica in two defeats.

Michel moved to Benfica on 31 May 2012, alongside Paços teammate Luisinho. On 31 August, however, he joined S.C. Braga of the same league on loan, in a deal that saw Lima go in the opposite direction.

In late January 2013, Braga terminated Michel's loan early and he returned to Benfica. He went on loan again in August, now to Qatar's Al-Wakrah SC.

Michel returned to Portugal on 1 September 2014, and the following 2 February he rejoined Penafiel, who now competed in the top tier.

References

External links

1986 births
Living people
Brazilian footballers
Footballers from Rio de Janeiro (city)
Association football forwards
Primeira Liga players
Liga Portugal 2 players
Segunda Divisão players
F.C. Penafiel players
F.C. Paços de Ferreira players
S.L. Benfica footballers
S.C. Braga players
Qatar Stars League players
Al-Wakrah SC players
Brazilian expatriate footballers
Expatriate footballers in Portugal
Expatriate footballers in Qatar
Brazilian expatriate sportspeople in Portugal